Prehistoric pile dwellings around Lake Zurich comprises 11 – or 10% of all European pile dwelling sites – of a total of 56 prehistoric pile dwellings around the Alps in Switzerland, that are located around Lake Zurich in the cantons of Schwyz, St. Gallen and Zürich.

Geography 

As part of a series of, in all, 111 European prehistoric pile dwellings around the Alps, they were added to the UNESCO World Heritage Site list in 2011. Archaeological excavations were conducted in only some of the sites, to preserve the heritage for future generations. Nevertheless, the excavations yielded evidence that provides insight into life in prehistoric times during the Neolithic and Bronze Age in Alpine Europe and the way communities interacted with their environment. The settlements are a unique group of exceptionally well-preserved and culturally rich archaeological sites, which constitute one of the most important sources for the study of early agrarian societies.

Topography 
Contrary to popular belief, the settlements were not erected over water, but on nearby marshy land, among them on the Seedamm respectively Frauenwinkel area, or, on the then swamp land between the Limmat and Lake Zurich around Sechseläutenplatz on small islands and peninsulas in Zürich. The settlements were set on piles to protect against occasional flooding by the Linth and Jona.

Sites on Lake Zurich lakeshore area 
Of the transnational 111 serial sites 56 are in Switzerland in 15 (out of 26) different Swiss cantons. Excavations of the "Pan-European stilt house settlements" began in Switzerland. During the winter of 1853–54, in the context of lowered water levels at Lake Zurich, archaeologist Ferdinand Keller discovered the remains of the Meilen–Rorenhaab site. The prehistoric lake crossings on the upper lake (Obersee) between Rapperswil and Hurden on the Seedamm area, including the four pile dwellings Rapperswil-Jona-Technikum, Seegubel, Freienbach–Hurden Rosshorn and Freienbach–Hurden Seefeld are unique on a world scale. The settlement Robenhausen at the Pfäffikersee is also a unique site, discovered and researched by Jakob Messikommer at the end of the 19th century, as being continuously inhabited for thousands of years; most of the settlements were inhabited for some decades and then re-erected at a quite different location.

Sources, among them area, date and location as well as coordinates and ID, used in the table base on Prehistoric pile dwellings around the Alps, and are listed as references. The list bases on the dates of December 2014.

Protection 

As well as being part of the 56 Swiss sites of the UNESCO World Heritage Site, each of these 11 prehistoric pile dwellings is also listed in the Swiss inventory of cultural property of national and regional significance as a Class A object of national importance.

Hence, the area of each settlement is provided as a historical site under federal protection, within the meaning of the Swiss Federal Act on the nature and cultural heritage (German: Bundesgesetz über den Natur- und Heimatschutz NHG) of 1 July 1966. Unauthorised researching and purposeful gathering of findings represent a criminal offense according to Art. 24.

See also 
 Prehistoric pile dwellings around the Alps

Literature 
 Peter J. Suter, Helmut Schlichtherle et al.: Pfahlbauten – Palafittes – Palafitte. Palafittes, Biel 2009. .
 Beat Eberschweiler: Ur- und frühgeschichtliche Verkehrswege über den Zürichsee: Erste Ergebnisse aus den Taucharchäologischen Untersuchungen beim Seedamm. In: Mitteilungen des Historischen Vereins des Kantons Schwyz, Volume 96, Schwyz 2004.

References

External links 

 

Prehistoric pile dwellings in Switzerland
Stilt houses
Lake Zurich
Cultural property of national significance in the canton of Schwyz
Cultural property of national significance in the canton of St. Gallen
Cultural property of national significance in the canton of Zürich